Blakea brevibractea is a species of plant in the family Melastomataceae. It is endemic to Ecuador.

References

brevibractea
Endemic flora of Ecuador
Taxonomy articles created by Polbot
Vulnerable plants
Taxobox binomials not recognized by IUCN